The Duhok International Film Festival (Duhok IFF) is an annual film festival held in Duhok, Kurdistan Region. Each year Duhok IFF presents new and exciting cinema from the Kurdish Cinema and beyond. The 8th edition was held from November 11 to 18, 2021 which focused on Afghanistan.

Overview

The festival aims to showcase innovative films of high artistic value with a notable handwriting made throughout the world. It shall work as a pinnacle point for all wishing to learn more about the possibilities the Kurdish regions have to offer. Duhok IFF wishes to create an atmosphere of exchange between different cultures and human values. Unique film experiences can be made and people can share their thirst for new discoveries and a passion for cinema in all its diversity.

A major task of the festival is to build a bridge between Kurdish film production and worldwide filmmaking. It wishes to create a launch platform for films from Kurdistan, taking the pulse of new tendencies and offering the opportunity to explore a terrain opening up in contemporary filmmaking. As a unique festival in this region, it understands itself as a force for new talents and meeting place for up and coming filmmakers.

Organizers
The Duhok International Film Festival is organized by the Kurdistan Regional Government's Ministry of Culture and Youth, General Directorate of Culture and Arts of Duhok City and the Cinema Directorate of Duhok in cooperation with mîtosfilm Berlin.

Film Program
The Duhok IFF's highly acclaimed film programme presents cinema from around the world encompassing a range of topical and universal themes.

In 2015 Duhok International Film Festival screened a line-up of 202 feature, shorts and documentary films from around the world including world premieres, international premieres and the festival reported its highest attendance record to date.

Opening the 2015 Festival was the Iraq submission for the Oscars Memories on Stone by Shawkat Amin Korki.	

The films, from 47 countries, in 38 languages, spanned the Duhok IFF's prestigious competition and popular out-of-competition segments, attracting more than 10,000 in audience attendance.

The line-up this year was selected from 600 submissions from 113 countries.

World Cinema

Each year, the Duhok International Film Festival presents in its World Cinema Section a selection of fiction feature films and documentaries and shorts from all over the world. This panorama of contemporary auteur cinema includes films by young talents alongside work by established filmmakers.

In this section, the Duhok IFF accept films from the following categories:

1- Feature films: narrative fiction features from around the world with a minimum length of 60 minutes.

2- Documentaries: documentary films from around the world with a minimum length of 60 minutes.

3- Short Films: the short film with a maximum length of 30 minutes can be narrative fiction or documentary.

Kurdish Cinema

The Kurdish Cinema Section presents a selection of Kurdish films; Feature, Documentaries, and shorts, made in a Kurdish-speaking region (Iraq, Iran, Turkey, Syria).

In this section, the Duhok IFF accept films from the following categories:

 Feature Films: narrative fiction features from Kurdistan (Iraq, Iran, Turkey, Syria) with a minimum length of 60 minutes.
 Documentaries: documentary films with a minimum length of 30 minutes.
 Short Films: the short film with a maximum length of 30 minutes.

Country Focus
Every year the Duhok IFF brings certain talent from different countries into focus, aiming to create a network with the country in spotlight. 
 2012 Focus Italy.
 2013 Focus Germany
 2015 Focus France 
 2016 Focus Nordic Countries
2019 Middle Easter Nation
2021 Focus Afghanistan

Official Prizes
Since its foundation, the Duhok International Film Festival have honored many Kurdish and International film-makers and talent. The competition and awards have raised the profile of the winners and made Duhok IFF a destination to discover the best of the region's cinema.

World Cinema Competition
 Yilmaz Güney Award for the Best International Feature-Length Film. (10.000.000 IQD)
 New Talent Award for the Best First or Second International Feature-Length Film. (5.000.000 IQD)
 Award for best International Documentary Film (5.000.000 IQD)
 Award for best International Short Film. (5.000.000 IQD)

Kurdish Cinema Competition
 Award for the Best Kurdish Feature Film. (10.000.000 IQD)
 Jury Award for the Best Kurdish Director of a Feature Film. (5.000.000 IQD)
 Award for the Best Kurdish Script. (4.000.000 IQD)
 Award for the Best Actor of a Kurdish Feature Film. (3.000.000 IQD)
 Award for the Best Actress of a Kurdish Feature Film. (3.000.000 IQD)
 Award for the Best Kurdish Documentary Film. (5.000.000 IQD)
 Duhok Cinema Directorate Award for the Best Short Film made by a Kurdish director. (8.500.000 IQD)
 Goethe-Institute Award for the Best Director of a Short Film (for the production of a new film) (5.000.000 IQD)
 Short Film Jury Award for a Short Film. (1.500.000 IQD)
 Duhok City Award for the Best Feature-Length Film shot in the Bahdinan Region sponsored by Duhok City Government. (10.000.000 IQD)
 Award of the Kurdish Writer's Association for the Best Kurdish Diaspora Film. (4.000.000 IQD)

References

External links
Duhok IFF Official Website
Duhok IFF Official Facebook Page
Duhok IFF on Twitter
Duhok IFF Official Google Page
Duhok IFF Official Youtube Channel
Duhok IFF on Flicker
Duhok IFF on Instagram

Recurring events established in 2011
Film festivals in Iraq
2010s in Iraqi Kurdistan
International Film Festival
International Film Festival
Kurdish film festivals